The list of shipwrecks in 2008 includes ships sunk, foundered, grounded, or otherwise lost during 2008.

January

3 January

8 January

14 January

15 January

29 January

31 January

February

1 February

6 February

9 February

16 February

22 February

29 February

March

6 March

8 March

23 March

25 March

28 March

Unknown

April

5 April

7 April

12 April

30 April

May

4 May

10 May

13 May

29 May

June

2 June

5 June

10 June

21 June

23 June

24 June

29 June

July

4 July

11 July

14 July

16 July

30 July

August

8 August

12 August

September

2 September

11 September

15 September

27 September

October

6 October

10 October

22 October

23 October

November

1 November

2 November

18 November

December

4 December

19 December

Unknown date

See also

References

2008
 
Ship